Taro (Colocasia esculenta) is a tropical plant grown primarily for its edible corms.

Taro may also refer to:

Plants
 Alocasia macrorrhizos, giant taro
 Cyrtosperma merkusii, swamp taro
Xanthosoma sagittifolium, blue taro

Places
Taro (river), a river in northern Italy
Taro (department), a former administrative division of the First French Empire in present Italy, named after the Taro River
Tarō, Iwate, Japan (田老町), former town in Shimohei District, Iwate Prefecture (now part of Miyako)
Taro Island, community in the Solomon Islands, capital of Choiseul Province
Tarou, Dominica, a small village in western Dominica

Other uses
Tarō (given name), a Japanese name
David Taro (born 1984), Solomon Islands soccer defender
Gerda Taro (1910–1937), German war photographer
Volkswagen Taro, a pickup truck, rebadge of the Toyota Hilux
Ultraman Taro, a 1973 television series
48 Infantry Division Taro, an Italian infantry division of World War II
"Taro", a song by the British band alt-J from the 2012 album An Awesome Wave
Taro Pharmaceuticals, a pharmaceutical manufacturer
 Territorial Army Reserve of Officers, former name of the U.K. Army Reserve
The monetary unit in the online game Cartoon Network Universe: FusionFall
 Taro, a dog that survived a winter in Antarctica; see Taro and Jiro

See also
Asashio Tarō (disambiguation)
Taarof, Persian customs